Hilde Dobiasch (born 5 October 1954) is an Austrian former cyclist. She competed in the women's road race event at the 1984 Summer Olympics.

References

External links
 

1954 births
Living people
Austrian female cyclists
Olympic cyclists of Austria
Cyclists at the 1984 Summer Olympics
Place of birth missing (living people)